The Museum of Modern Art is a museum in New York City, USA.

Museum of Modern Art may also refer to:

Austria
Mumok, Vienna
Museum der Moderne Salzburg

Australia 

 Museum of Modern Art Australia

Belgium
 Museum of Modern Art, Antwerp

Brazil
 Museum of Modern Art of Bahia
 Museum of Modern Art, Rio de Janeiro
 São Paulo Museum of Modern Art

Colombia
 Bogotá Museum of Modern Art
 Medellín Museum of Modern Art
 Barranquilla Museum of Modern Art

Denmark
 Arken Museum of Modern Art, Ishøj

Egypt
 Museum of Modern Art in Egypt, Port Said

Equatorial Guinea
 Museum of Modern Art Equatorial Guinea, Malabo

France
 Château de Montsoreau-Museum of Contemporary Art
 Musée d'Art Moderne de la Ville de Paris
 Musée d'Art Moderne de Céret
 Musée National d'Art Moderne, Paris
 Strasbourg Museum of Modern and Contemporary Art

Germany
 Museum für Moderne Kunst, Frankfurt am Main

Guatemala
 Museo Nacional de Arte Moderno "Carlos Mérida", Guatemala City

Ireland
 Irish Museum of Modern Art, Dublin

Japan
 Akita Museum of Modern Art
 Hokkaido Museum of Modern Art
 The Museum of Modern Art, Gunma
 The Museum of Modern Art, Ibaraki
 Museum of Modern Art, Kamakura & Hayama
 Museum of Modern Art, Niigata
 Museum of Modern Art, Saitama
 Museum of Modern Art, Toyama
 Museum of Modern Art, Wakayama
 National Museum of Modern Art, Kyoto
 National Museum of Modern Art, Tokyo

Kuwait
 Museum of Modern Art (Kuwait), Kuwait City (Mathaf Al-Fann Al-Hadeeth)

Mexico
 Museo de Arte Moderno, Mexico City

Poland
 Museum of Modern Art, Warsaw

Qatar
 Mathaf: Arab Museum of Modern Art, Doha

Slovenia
 Museum of Modern Art (Ljubljana)

Sweden
 Moderna Museet, Stockholm

United Kingdom

England
 Museum of Modern Art, Oxford (now Modern Art Oxford)

Wales
 MOMA, Wales, Machynlleth

United States

California
 San Francisco Museum of Modern Art

New York 
 Museum of Modern Art

See also
 Gallery of Modern Art (disambiguation)
 National Gallery of Modern Art (disambiguation)